This list of thelodonts is an attempt to create a comprehensive listing of all genera from the fossil record that have ever been considered to be members of the class Thelodonti. This list excludes purely vernacular terms. It includes (almost) all commonly accepted genera, but also genera that are now considered invalid, doubtful (nomina dubia), or were not formally published (nomina nuda), as well as junior synonyms of more established names, and genera that are no longer considered thelodonts.

This list includes 67 generic names.

A
†Amaltheolepis
†Angaralepis
†Apalolepis
†Archipelepis
†Australolepis
B
†Barlowodus
†Boothialepis
†Boreania
†Bystrowia
C
†Canonia
†Cephalopterus
†Chattertonodus
†Coelolepides
†Coelolepis
†Cometicercus
D
†Drepanolepis
E
†Eestilepis
†Erepsilepis
F
†Furcacauda
G
†Gampsolepis
†Glacialepis
†Goniophorus
†Gonioporus
†Goniporus
H
†Helenolepis
I
†Illoganellia
J
†Jesslepis
K
†Katoporodus
†Katoporus
L
†Lanarkia
†Larolepis
†Loganella
†Loganellia
†Logania
†Longodus
N
†Nethertonodus
†Nikolivia
†Nunavutia
O
†Oeselia
†Overia
P
†Pachylepis synonym of Thelodus
†Paralogania
†Parathelodus
†Paraturinia
†Pezopallichthys
†Phillipsilepis
†Phlebolepis
†Praetrilogania
S
†Sandivia
†Shielia
†Sigurdia
†Skamolepis
†Sophialepis
†Sphenonectris
†Stroinolepis
T
†Talimaalepis
†Talivalia
†Thelodus
†Thelolepis
†Thelolepsis
†Thulolepis
†Trimerolepis
†Turinea
†Turinia
V
†Valiukia
†Valyalepis
Z
†Zuegelepis

References 

Thelodont
 List